Moorhead may refer to:

Places
In the United States:
 Moorhead, Iowa
 Moorhead, Minnesota
 Moorhead, Mississippi

Other uses
 Moorhead (surname)
 Accrington Moorhead Sports College, Lancashire, UK
 Minnesota State University Moorhead, USA

See also
 Moorehead, a surname
 Morehead (disambiguation)